The 2017–18 Southern Miss Lady Eagles basketball team represents the University of Southern Mississippi during the 2017–18 NCAA Division I women's basketball season. The Lady Eagles, led by fourteenth year head coach Joye Lee-McNelis, play their home games at Reed Green Coliseum and were members of Conference USA. They finished the season 15–15, 7–9 in C-USA play to finish in a 3 way tie for seventh place. They lost in the first round of the C-USA women's tournament to UTEP.

Roster

Schedule

|-
!colspan=9 style=| Exhibition

|-
!colspan=9 style=| Non-conference regular season

|-
!colspan=9 style=| Conference USA regular season

|-
!colspan=9 style=| Conference USA Women's Tournament

See also
2017–18 Southern Miss Golden Eagles basketball team

References

Southern Miss Lady Eagles basketball seasons
Southern Miss